Puttin' It on the Map is the sixth album by the rapper JT the Bigga Figga.  The album was released on June 27, 2000, for Get Low Recordz, and re-released in 2006 for SMC Recordings. It was produced by JT the Bigga Figga.  It was the second of his four albums released in the year 2000.

Track listing
"The 2 of Us" – 2:37
"Young Black Male" – 3:05
"Platinume Playaz" – 5:19
"Zeniths in the Summertime" – 4:49
"Good for Nuthin'" – 4:44
"Playa Haterz" – 1:38
"History Class" – 1:19
"Dank or Dope" – 8:20
"GLP 4.5.7" – 1:40
"Right on Time" – 4:35
"Cream of the Crop" – 4:07
"The Bust" – 1:28
"Me and My Nigga" – 4:07
"No Competition" – 3:58
"Freestyle 1" – 3:17
"Freestyle 2" – 2:22

References

JT the Bigga Figga albums
2000 albums
SMC Recordings albums